Andre Riley Givens (born June 25, 1990) better known by the name Andre Fili is an American mixed martial artist who competes in the Featherweight division. Fili is of Samoan and Native Hawaiian descent  and is currently signed with the Ultimate Fighting Championship (UFC).

Background
Fili grew up in a broken home, where both of the parents were violent against each other and also their children. Fili's mother raised her kids alone, as her husband was serving jail time on multiple occasions and was not living in the house. The violent and unstable upbringing left its mark on Fili, and he started seeking out street brawls as a teenager. In 2009, Fili moved to Sacramento and while still under probation, he joined Team Alpha Male and began training mixed martial arts.

Mixed martial arts career 
Fili made his professional debut on December 12, 2009 against Anthony Motley. Fili won the fight via TKO and won his next three fights via TKO as well. Fili suffered his first loss, by knee injury, against Strikeforce vet Derrick Burnsed. Fili bounced back from the loss winning his next 8 fights including a win over Strikeforce veteran Alexander Crispim.

Ultimate Fighting Championship
Fili made his promotional debut on October 19, 2013 at UFC 166 against Jeremy Larsen. Fili, who was in the middle of a training camp for a welterweight bout in another promotion, took the featherweight fight on short notice (two weeks) to replace an injured Charles Oliveira. The bout was contested at a catchweight, as Fili was unable to make the required weight.  Fili won the fight via TKO in the second round.

Fili faced Max Holloway on April 26, 2014 at UFC 172. He lost the fight via submission in the third round.

Fili was expected to face Sean Soriano on September 5, 2014 at UFC Fight Night 50.  However, Fili was forced from the bout with an injury and replaced by Chas Skelly.

Fili faced Felipe Arantes on October 25, 2014 at UFC 179. He won via unanimous decision.

Fili faced Godofredo Pepey on March 21, 2015 at UFC Fight Night 62. He lost the fight via submission in the first round.

Fili was expected to face Clay Collard on September 5, 2015 at UFC 191.  However, Fili was forced out of the bout with injury and replaced by Tiago Trator.

Fili faced Gabriel Benítez on November 21, 2015 at The Ultimate Fighter Latin America 2 Finale. He won the fight via knockout in the first round and also earned a Performance of the Night bonus.

Fili faced Yair Rodríguez on April 23, 2016 at UFC 197. Fili lost the fight via knockout in the second round.

Fili faced Hacran Dias on October 1, 2016 at UFC Fight Night 96, filling in for an injured Brian Ortega. He won the fight via unanimous decision.

Fili was expected to face Doo Ho Choi on July 29, 2017 at UFC 214. However Choi pulled out of the fight and was replaced by promotional newcomer Calvin Kattar. Fili lost the fight by unanimous decision.

Fili faced Artem Lobov on October 21, 2017 at UFC Fight Night 118. He won the fight via unanimous decision.

Fili faced Dennis Bermudez on January 27, 2018 at UFC on Fox 27. He won the fight via split decision.

Fili faced Michael Johnson on August 25, 2018 at UFC Fight Night 135.  He lost the fight via split decision.

Fili faced Myles Jury on February 17, 2019 at UFC on ESPN 1. He won the fight by unanimous decision.

Fili faced Sheymon Moraes on July 13, 2019 at UFC on ESPN+ 13. He won the fight via knockout in round one. This win earned him the Performance of the Night award.

Fili faced Sodiq Yusuff on January 18, 2020 at UFC 246. He lost the fight by unanimous decision.

Fili faced Charles Jourdain on June 13, 2020 at UFC on ESPN: Eye vs. Calvillo. He won the bout via split decision.

Fili faced Bryce Mitchell on October 31, 2020 at UFC Fight Night 181. He lost the fight via unanimous decision.

Fili faced Daniel Pineda on June 26, 2021 at UFC Fight Night 190. Early in round two, Fili accidentally poked Pineda in the eye and he was deemed unable to continue. The fight was declared a no contest.

Fili faced Joanderson Brito on April 30, 2022 at UFC on ESPN 35. He lost the fight via TKO in round one.

Fili was scheduled to face Lando Vannata on September 17, 2022 at UFC Fight Night 210. However, Vannata was forced to pull from the event due to injury and was replaced by Bill Algeo. Fili won the fight via split decision.

Fili  was scheduled to face Lucas Almeidaon February 25, 2023 at UFC Fight Night 220. However, Fili was forced to withdraw from the bout due to emergency eye surgery..

Championships and awards
Ultimate Fighting Championship
Performance of the Night (Two Times) 
Most split decision wins in UFC Featherweight division history (3)

Mixed martial arts record

|Win
|align=center|22–9 (1)
|Bill Algeo
|Decision (split)
|UFC Fight Night: Sandhagen vs. Song 
|
|align=center|3
|align=center|5:00
|Las Vegas, Nevada, United States
|
|-
|Loss
|align=center|21–9 (1)
|Joanderson Brito
|TKO (punches)
|UFC on ESPN: Font vs. Vera 
|
|align=center|1
|align=center|0:41
|Las Vegas, Nevada, United States
|
|-
| NC
|align=center|21–8 (1)
|Daniel Pineda
|NC (accidental eye poke)
|UFC Fight Night: Gane vs. Volkov 
|
|align=center|2
|align=center|0:46
|Las Vegas, Nevada, United States
|
|-
|Loss
|align=center|21–8
|Bryce Mitchell
|Decision (unanimous)
|UFC Fight Night: Hall vs. Silva
|
|align=center|3
|align=center|5:00
|Las Vegas, Nevada, United States
|
|-
|Win
|align=center|21–7
|Charles Jourdain
|Decision (split)
|UFC on ESPN: Eye vs. Calvillo
|
|align=center|3
|align=center|5:00
|Las Vegas, Nevada, United States
|
|-
|Loss
|align=center|20–7
|Sodiq Yusuff
|Decision (unanimous)
|UFC 246 
|
|align=center|3
|align=center|5:00
|Las Vegas, Nevada, United States
| 
|-
|Win
|align=center|20–6
|Sheymon Moraes
|KO (punches)
|UFC Fight Night: de Randamie vs. Ladd 
|
|align=center|1
|align=center|3:07
|Sacramento, California, United States
|
|-
|Win
|align=center|19–6
|Myles Jury
|Decision (unanimous)
|UFC on ESPN: Ngannou vs. Velasquez 
|
|align=center|3
|align=center|5:00
|Phoenix, Arizona, United States
| 
|-
|Loss
|align=center|18–6
|Michael Johnson
|Decision (split)
|UFC Fight Night: Gaethje vs. Vick 
|
|align=center|3
|align=center|5:00
|Lincoln, Nebraska, United States
|
|-
|Win
|align=center|18–5
|Dennis Bermudez
|Decision (split)
|UFC on Fox: Jacaré vs. Brunson 2 
|
|align=center|3
|align=center|5:00
|Charlotte, North Carolina, United States
|
|-
|Win
|align=center|17–5
|Artem Lobov
| Decision (unanimous)
|UFC Fight Night: Cowboy vs. Till
|
|align=center|3
|align=center|5:00
|Gdańsk, Poland
|
|-
|Loss
|align=center|16–5
|Calvin Kattar
|Decision (unanimous)
|UFC 214
|
|align=center|3
|align=center|5:00
|Anaheim, California, United States
|
|-
|Win
|align=center|16–4 
|Hacran Dias
|Decision (unanimous)
|UFC Fight Night: Lineker vs. Dodson
|
|align=center| 3
|align=center| 5:00
|Portland, Oregon, United States
|     
|-
|Loss
|align=center|15–4
|Yair Rodríguez
|KO (head kick)
|UFC 197
|
|align=center|2
|align=center|2:15
|Las Vegas, Nevada, United States
| 
|-
|Win
|align=center|15–3
|Gabriel Benítez
|KO (head kick and punches)
|The Ultimate Fighter Latin America 2 Finale: Magny vs. Gastelum
|
|align=center|1
|align=center|3:13
|Monterrey, Mexico
|
|-
|Loss
|align=center|14–3
|Godofredo Pepey
|Submission (flying triangle choke)
|UFC Fight Night: Maia vs. LaFlare
|
|align=center|1
|align=center|3:14
|Rio de Janeiro, Brazil
|
|-
| Win
|align=center| 14–2
|Felipe Arantes
|Decision (unanimous)
|UFC 179
|
|align=center|3
|align=center|5:00
|Rio de Janeiro, Brazil
|
|-
| Loss
|align=center| 13–2
|Max Holloway
|Submission (guillotine choke)
|UFC 172
|
|align=center| 3
|align=center| 3:39
|Baltimore, Maryland, United States
|
|-
| Win
|align=center| 13–1
|Jeremy Larsen
| TKO (punches)
|UFC 166
|
|align=center| 2
|align=center| 0:53
|Houston, Texas, United States
|
|-
|Win
|align=center| 12–1
|Adrian Diaz
|TKO (punches)
|WFC 5 
|May 3, 2013
|align=center|3
|align=center|1:29
|Sacramento, California, United States
|
|-
| Win
|align=center| 11–1
|Enoch Wilson
|Decision (unanimous)
|TPF 15
|November 15, 2012
|align=center|3
|align=center|5:00
|Lemoore, California, United States
|
|-
| Win
|align=center| 10–1
|Ricky Wallace
|Technical Submission (armbar)
|TPF 14
|September 7, 2012
|align=center|2
|align=center|4:08
|Lemoore, California, United States
|
|-
| Win
|align=center| 9–1
|Jesse Bowen
|TKO (punches)
|WFC: Showdown
|June 9, 2012
|align=center|1
|align=center|2:57
|Yuba City, California, United States
|
|-
| Win
|align=center| 8–1
|Matt Muramoto
|Submission (triangle choke)
|KOTC: All In
|April 21, 2012
|align=center|1
|align=center|1:59
|Oroville, California, United States
|
|-
| Win
|align=center| 7–1
|Alexander Crispim
|Decision (unanimous)
|CCFC: The Return
|March 3, 2012
|align=center|3
|align=center|5:00
|Santa Rosa, California, United States
|
|-
| Win
|align=center| 6–1
|Vaymond Dennis
| Submission (armbar)
|WFC: Bruvado Bash
|January 7, 2012
|align=center|2
|align=center|1:51
|Placerville, California, United States
|
|-
| Win
|align=center| 5–1
|Tony Rios
|Decision (unanimous)
|CCFC: Fall Classic
|October 8, 2011
|align=center|3
|align=center|5:00
|Sacramento, California, United States
|
|-
| Loss
|align=center| 4–1
|Derrick Burnsed
|TKO (knee injury)
|Rebel Fighter: Domination
|October 2, 2010
|align=center|5
|align=center|1:22
|Roseville, California, United States
|
|-
| Win
|align=center| 4–0
|Tony Reveles
|KO (head kick)
|Rebel Fighter
|August 21, 2010
|align=center|1
|align=center|1:01
|Placerville, California, United States
|
|-
| Win
|align=center| 3–0
|Justin Smitley
|TKO (punches)
|Gladiator Challenge: Champions
|May 1, 2010
|align=center|2
|align=center|1:41
|Placerville, California, United States
|
|-
| Win
|align=center| 2–0
|Cain Campos
|TKO (punches)
|Gladiator Challenge: Domination
|March 6, 2010
|align=center|1
|align=center|0:16
|Placerville, California, United States
|
|-
| Win
|align=center| 1–0
|Anthony Motley
|TKO (punches)
|Gladiator Challenge: Chain Reaction
|December 12, 2009
|align=center|1
|align=center|1:01
|Placerville, California, United States
|
|-

See also
 List of current UFC fighters
 List of male mixed martial artists

References

External links
 
 

1990 births
Living people
American male mixed martial artists
American people of Native Hawaiian descent
American sportspeople of Samoan descent
People from Federal Way, Washington
People from Sacramento, California
Sportspeople from King County, Washington
Ultimate Fighting Championship male fighters
Featherweight mixed martial artists